The IAAF World Cross Challenge was an annual global series of cross country running competitions organized by the International Association of Athletics Federations (IAAF). Athletes accumulated points in the series' cross country meets during the season, which typically began in December and finished in March prior to the annual IAAF World Cross Country Championships. The series was based upon the IAAF Grand Prix track and field circuit and the IAAF hoped to similarly boost the sport of cross country running. The last series was held in 1999–2000, after which point it was replaced by the IAAF Cross Country Permit Meetings series which featured similar races but did not have a point scoring format.

Editions

Meetings

Results

Men

Women

See also
IAAF Combined Events Challenge
IAAF Hammer Throw Challenge
IAAF Race Walking Challenge

References

Recurring sporting events established in 1990
Recurring sporting events disestablished in 2000
World Cross Challenge
Cross Challenge
Annual athletics series